Logan Waller Page (January 10, 1870 – December 9, 1918) was an American administrator, who became the first Director of the newly created Office of Public Roads in 1905, after the US Congress passed an act that consolidated the Office of Public Inquiry and the Bureau of Chemistry.

Five years earlier, Page, a geologist with the Massachusetts State Highway Commission, accepted the position of Chief of the Division of Tests in Washington. In this post, his responsibilities included a study of road building on a national scale. As a geologist in Massachusetts, he had conducted the first extensive investigation of road-building materials in America.

Later, as Chief of the Bureau of Chemistry, he began a series of investigations, which won international acclaim for the laboratories he directed.

Page introduced a scientific movement in road building that won enthusiastic national public support. He initiated "a petrographic study" of road-building materials; wrote the first comprehensive report on the elements of road-building rocks; and improved French rock-testing machines, whereby physical tests of road-building rocks became a routine procedure.

On December 9, 1918, Logan attended a meeting with Executive Committee of the American Association of State Highway Officials. Later that same day, he became ill during dinner and died a few hours later.

References

 

1870 births
1918 deaths
Administrators of the Federal Highway Administration
People from Richmond, Virginia